Caenorhabditis virilis is a species of nematodes in the genus Caenorhabditis. The type isolate JU1528 was collected in an orchard in Orsay, France.

Prior to 2014, it was referred to as C. sp. 13. It groups with C. portoensis (sp. 6) in the 'Drosophilae' supergroup in phylogenetic studies.

References

External links 

 Caenorhabditis virilis at the Caenorhabditis Genetics Center, University of Minnesota

virilis
Nematodes described in 2014
Fauna of Metropolitan France